Stone Soup is a folk story that teaches the value of sharing.

Stone Soup may also refer to:

Art, entertainment, and media

Literature
Stone Soup: An Old Tale (1947), children's book by Marcia Brown
Stone Soup (1968), book by Ann McGovern
Stone Soup (2003),  children's book by Jon J. Muth set in China

Other media
 Stone Soup (comic strip), US comic strip
 Stone Soupercomputer, a compute cluster
 Dungeon Crawl Stone Soup, computer game
 Stone Soup (magazine), California, US

Brands, enterprises, and organizations
 Stone Soup (beer)
 Stone Soup Coffeehouse, a folk music venue, Pawtucket, Rhode Island, US
 Stone Soup Cooperative, a housing cooperative
 Stonesoup School, located in Crescent City, Florida, US